Dannie Richmond Plays Charles Mingus is an album by drummer Dannie Richmond and the Last Mingus Band which was recorded in Italy in 1980 and released on the Dutch Timeless label. The album features compositions by jazz bassist Charles Mingus performed by members of his final working group with Cameron Brown substituting for the late Mingus.

Reception

Scott Yanow of Allmusic notes, "Everyone is in fine form and, although one misses Mingus, the music has its exciting moments".

Track listing 
All compositions by Charles Mingus except as indicated
 "Fables of Faubus" - 13:21
 "Goodbye Pork Pie Hat" - 4:47
 "Nostalgia in Times Square" - 4:49
 "Noddin' Your Head Blues" - 5:10
 "Duke Ellington's Sound of Love" - 10:14
 "Wee" (Sy Johnson) - 5:07

Personnel 
Dannie Richmond - drums
Jack Walrath - trumpet
Ricky Ford - tenor saxophone
Bob Neloms - piano
Cameron Brown - bass

References 

Dannie Richmond albums
1981 albums
Timeless Records albums
Charles Mingus tribute albums